Norman Hollyn (May 11, 1952 – March 17, 2019) was an American film editor and Michael Kahn Endowed Chair in Editing at the University of Southern California School of Cinematic Arts.

Biography 
Hollyn was born in New York on May 11, 1952, and attended Stony Brook University. He taught at the University of Southern California as the first Michael Kahn Endowed Chair in Editing within the School of Cinematic Arts. Hollyn died in Yokohama, Japan, on March 17, 2019, where he was serving as a guest lecturer at the Tokyo University of the Arts.

Selected filmography
Daniel and the Towers (1987)
Heathers (1988)
Meet the Applegates (1990)
The Local Stigmatic (1990)
Jersey Girl (1992)
It's Pat (1994)
Girl in the Cadillac (1995)
My Teacher's Wife (1995)
Mad Dog Time (1996)
Quicksilver Highway (1997)
Under Wraps (1997)
Shot (2017)

References

External links

1952 births
2019 deaths
American film editors
Stony Brook University alumni
University of Southern California faculty
Deaths from embolism